The men's pole vault event at the 2002 African Championships in Athletics was held in Radès, Tunisia on August 7.

Results

References

2002 African Championships in Athletics
Pole vault at the African Championships in Athletics